Andrew Jenkins Shaw (born 19 December 1898 in Scotland, died 1983 in New Zealand) was a professional golfer from New Zealand. He was a seven-time winner of the New Zealand PGA Championship (1928, 1929, 1931–1934, 1946) and a seven-time winner of the New Zealand Open (1926, 1929–1932, 1934, 1936).

Shaw learnt his golf at Troon in Scotland. He arrived in Christchurch, New Zealand in 1920 and was a member of Avondale Golf Club. He left in 1921 to take up a professional coaching position at Hamilton Golf Club. However, he was only briefly at Hamilton, returning to Christchurch in 1922 as professional at Hagley Golf Club before taking a position at a golf school in Wellington in 1924.

References

New Zealand male golfers
1898 births
1983 deaths